Grevillea yorkrakinensis is a shrub of the genus Grevillea native to Western Australia.

It blooms between May and October and produces an axillary raceme irregular inflorescence with orange or red flowers with green or pink styles.

The species was first formally described by the botanist Charles Austin Gardner in 1923 as part of the work Contributions to the flora of Western Australia as published in the Journal and Proceedings of the Royal Society of Western Australia.
The type specimen was collected by Gardner near Yorkrakine in 1922.

The shrub is endemic to an area in the south eastern Wheatbelt and western Goldfields-Esperance regions of Western Australia where it is found on sandplains and often on or near granite outcrops where it grows in sandy, sandy-loam and sandy-clay soils often with gravel. It has a scattered distribution between Mount Gibson and Wubin in the north down to Hyden and Southern Cross in the south where it makes up part of shrubland or mallee heath communities.

See also
 List of Grevillea species

References

yorkrakinensis
Proteales of Australia
Eudicots of Western Australia
Plants described in 1923
Taxa named by Charles Gardner